She Devil is a 1957 American widescreen science fiction horror film, shot in RegalScope, from Regal Films, that was produced, written, and directed by Kurt Neumann. The film  stars Mari Blanchard, Jack Kelly, and Albert Dekker and was theatrically released by 20th Century Fox on a double bill with Regal's Kronos.

She Devil is based on the science fiction short story "The Adaptive Ultimate" by  Stanley G. Weinbaum.

Plot
Dr. Dan Scott has developed a serum that cures the ills of animals, although it did alter the color of a leopard used in one experiment. Eager to try it on a human being, despite his mentor Dr. Richard Bach's many concerns, Scott finds a consenting patient in Kyra Zelas, a woman with a meek personality who is dying of tuberculosis.

The serum seems to cure her instantly. It also dramatically affects her personality. Kyra shows a flash of temper, then jumps out of a car and runs into a shop, where she steals a dress then disguises her identity by willing her hair color to change from brunette to blonde.

Scott falls in love with her. At a party, however, Kyra seduces a guest, Barton Kendall. When his wife Evelyn objects, Kyra disguises herself again and murders her. Then she marries Kendall, but behaves monstrously toward him. The doctors use a ploy that leaves Kyra in an unconscious state, then perform surgery to reverse the serum's effect, which also restores Kyra's terminal disease.

Cast
 Mari Blanchard as Kyra Zelas
 Jack Kelly as Dr. Dan Scott
 Albert Dekker as Dr. Richard Bach
 John Archer as Barton Kendall
 Fay Baker as Evelyn Kendall
 Blossom Rock as Hannah, the Housekeeper (as Blossom Rock)
 Paul Cavanagh as Sugar Daddy
 George Baxter as Store Manager
 Helen Jay as Blond Nurse
 Joan Bradshaw as Redhead
 X Brands as Police Officer
 Tod Griffin as Interne

Reception

Critical response
Film critic Glenn Erickson discussed the production in his review of the film, "The B&W 'Regalscope' format gives this modest production a handsome look, along with Kurt Neumann's competent if not stylish direction. Cameraman Karl Struss (of Murnau's Sunrise) slightly over-lights Kyra in the party scene to make her hair seem to glow, a subtle effect for sure. The hair-color changing is a filter trick, an invention Struss first used back in the silent era. A spectacular car crash murder scene is an RKO stock shot lifted from the 1952 Otto Preminger noir Angel Face and cropped for the 'scope format. It still looks frightening. Suggesting an undeveloped noir angle, a 'haunting' portrait of Kyra becomes the focus of Dan's obsession. It's supposed to be the work of an Italian master, but looks more like a Paint By Numbers atrocity."

See also
 List of American films of 1957

References

Bibliography
 Warren, Bill. Keep Watching the Skies: American Science Fiction Films of the Fifties, 21st Century Edition. Jefferson, North Carolina: McFarland & Company, 2009, (First edition 1982). .

External links
 
 
 
 
 She Devil information site and DVD/Blu-ray review at DVD Beaver (includes images)
 

1957 films
1957 horror films
1950s science fiction horror films
Films based on science fiction short stories
American science fiction horror films
American black-and-white films
Films directed by Kurt Neumann
20th Century Fox films
Films scored by Paul Sawtell
1950s English-language films
1950s American films